NGC 999 is an intermediate spiral galaxy located in the constellation Andromeda about 195 million light-years from the Milky Way. It was discovered by the French astronomer Edouard Stephan in 1871.

See also 
 List of NGC objects (1–1000)
NGC 1001
NGC 996

References 

0999
Intermediate spiral galaxies
Andromeda (constellation)
010026